Glyphostoma is a genus of sea snails, marine gastropod mollusks in the family Clathurellidae.

Description
The shell has a fusiform shape. The siphonal canal is rather long. The genus is characterized by a very heavy outer lip, which is strongly rugose within. The inner lip is more or less wrinkled.

Species
Species within the genus Glyphostoma include:

 Glyphostoma aguadillana (Dall & Simpson, 1901)
 Glyphostoma aliciae (Melvill & Standen, 1895)
 Glyphostoma alliteratum Hedley, 1915
 Glyphostoma bayeri Olsson, 1971
 Glyphostoma bertiniana (Tapparone-Canefri, 1878)
 Glyphostoma candida (Hinds, 1843)
 Glyphostoma canfieldi (Dall, 1871)
 Glyphostoma cara (Thiele, 1925)
 Glyphostoma claudoni (Dautzenberg, 1900)
 Glyphostoma coronaseminale Garcia, 2015
 Glyphostoma dedonderi Goethaels & Monsecour, 2008
 Glyphostoma dentiferum Gabb, 1872
 Glyphostoma dialitha (Melvill & Standen, 1896)
 Glyphostoma elsae Bartsch, 1934
 Glyphostoma epicasta Bartsch, 1934
 Glyphostoma gabbii (Dall, 1889)
 Glyphostoma golfoyaquense Maury, 1917
 Glyphostoma granulifera (Schepman, 1913)
 Glyphostoma gratula (Dall, 1881)
 Glyphostoma hervieri Dautzenberg, 1932
 Glyphostoma immaculata Dall, 1908
 Glyphostoma infracincta (G.B. Sowerby III, 1893)
 Glyphostoma kihikihi Kay, 1979
 Glyphostoma latirella (Melvill, J.C. & R. Standen, 1897, "1896")
 Glyphostoma leucum (Bush, 1893)
 Glyphostoma lyuhrurngae Lai, 2005
 Glyphostoma maldivica Sysoev, 1996
 Glyphostoma myrae Shasky, 1971
 Glyphostoma neglecta (Hinds, 1843)
 Glyphostoma oenoa Bartsch, 1934
 Glyphostoma oliverai Kilburn & Lan, 2004
 Glyphostoma otohimeae Kosuge, 1981
 Glyphostoma partefilosa Dall, 1919
 Glyphostoma phalera (Dall, 1889)
 Glyphostoma pilsbryi Schwengel, 1940
 Glyphostoma polynesiensis (Reeve, 1845)
 Glyphostoma purpurascens (Dunker, 1871)
 Glyphostoma pustulosa McLean & Poorman, 1971
 Glyphostoma rostrata Sysoev & Bouchet, 2001
 Glyphostoma rugosum (Mighels, 1845)
 Glyphostoma scalarinum (Deshayes, 1863)
 Glyphostoma scobina McLean & Poorman, 1971
 Glyphostoma supraplicata Sysoev, 1996
 Glyphostoma thalassoma Dall, 1908
 Glyphostoma turtoni (E. A. Smith, 1890)

Taxon inquirendum
 Glyphostoma tigroidellum Hervier, 1896 
Species brought into synonymy
 Glyphostoma alphonsianum Hervier, 1896: synonym of Etrema alphonsianum (Hervier, 1896)
 Glyphostoma crosseanum Hervier, 1896: synonym of Lienardia crosseanum (Hervier, 1896)
 Glyphostoma cymodoce Dall, 1919: synonym of Crockerella cymodoce (Dall, 1919)
 Glyphostoma disconicum Hervier, 1896: synonym of Lienardia disconicum (Hervier, 1896)
 Glyphostoma gaidei Hervier, 1896: synonym of Lienardia gaidei (Hervier, 1896)
 Glyphostoma glabriplicatum Sowerby III, 1913: synonym of Etrema glabriplicatum (Sowerby III, 1913)
 Glyphostoma goubini Hervier, 1896: synonym of Lienardia goubini (Hervier, 1896)
 Glyphostoma gruveli Dautzenberg, 1932: synonym of Eucithara gruveli (Dautzenberg, 1932)
 Glyphostoma hendersoni Bartsch, 1934: synonym of Lioglyphostoma hendersoni (Bartsch, 1934)
 Glyphostoma herminea Bartsch, 1934: synonym of Miraclathurella herminea (Bartsch, 1934)
 Glyphostoma melanoxytum Hervier, 1896: synonym of Kermia melanoxytum (Hervier, 1896)
 Glyphostoma minutissimelirata Hervier, 1896: synonym of Etrema minutissimelirata (Hervier, 1896)
 Glyphostoma paucimaculata Angas, 1880: synonym of Etrema paucimaculata (Angas, 1880)
 Glyphostoma permiscere Nowell-Usticke, 1969: synonym of Truncadaphne permiscere (Nowell-Usticke, 1969)
 Glyphostoma roseocincta Oliver, 1915: synonym of Lienardia roseocincta (Oliver, 1915)
 Glyphostoma rubrocincta Smith, E.A., 1882: synonym of Eucithara vittata (Hinds, 1843) 
 Glyphostoma strombillum Hervier, 1896: synonym of Lienardia strombillum (Hervier, 1896)
 Glyphostoma subspurcum Hervier, 1896: synonym of Kermia subspurcum (Hervier, 1896)
 Glyphostoma tenera Hedley, 1899: synonym of Etrema tenera (Hedley, 1899)
 Glyphostoma tribulationis Hedley, 1909: synonym of Heterocithara tribulationis (Hedley, 1909)
 Glyphostoma trigonostomum Hervier, 1896: synonym of Etrema trigonostomum (Hervier, 1896)

References